The Foteviken Museum is an archaeological open-air museum on the Höllviken peninsula in southern Skåne, Sweden. It contains a reconstruction of a large Viking Age settlement and a "viking reservation", and visitors participate in living history reenactments; it also performs research and functions as the municipal museum of Vellinge Municipality and part of Fotevikens Kulturcenter, a group of cultural facilities on the peninsula.

History
The museum grew out of the archaeological investigation of sunken viking ships in Foteviken Bay and local interest in the Battle of Fotevik, which was fought there on 4 June 1134. A group headed by Björn M. Buttler Jakobsen formed a foundation called SVEG (Scandinavian Viking Explorer Group) in 1987. In 1993, the foundation started planning to open a maritime museum; in 1995, after changing their focus towards Viking Age living history, they opened Foteviken Museum, with Jakobsen as its director.

Facilities and programmes

The museum occupies an approximately  site on Höllviken Bay. In addition to a reconstruction of a large Viking Age settlement, the 'Viking Reserve', there are research and handicrafts buildings and three large halls, including a restaurant seating up to 200 and a feast hall. The gate to the reserve is indicated on the museum map as a "border gate" between Sweden and the reserve. Buildings in the reserve are built or rebuilt by staff and volunteers almost every season, with traditional methods being supplemented by modern technology in winter;  there were about 22, including a tapestry-lined chieftain's house and a hof. The reserve opens for the summer season on May Day, and is intended as a recreation of a large settlement late in the Viking Age, during the transition to the Scandinavian Middle Ages and the increasing influence of Christianity in the North. This enables the museum to include the Battle of Fotevik, which clearly belongs to the medieval period. Those staying in the reserve live as Viking Age people and are not permitted to have modern equipment or wear modern clothing. It is marketed as open to "all Vikings" and attracts large numbers of Viking Age reenactors; many of the visitors are from outside Scandinavia, particularly from Germany. An international viking thing is held in the Tinghöll building every year; according to the museum, in 2001 66 representatives from 22 countries were present.

The museum has a library which is available for research and makes heavy use of electronic media. It offers various educational programmes, including overnight stays; since it is also the municipal museum of Vellinge, these are free to local schools. However, the reserve has no electricity and minimal signage.

Seasonal programmes
In Midwinter the museum hosts a fire festival. A May Eve bonfire is also lit to reproduce a traditional viking celebration of the return of spring. At these and other events, the director plays the role of 'King Björn'.

Summer activities at the museum climax in Viking Week in late June; this includes craft days and since 1997 a viking market. At the market in summer 2016, five actors in a group who travel between Viking Age reenactment sites, the Nordic International Slave Trade Company, reportedly threw a bag over a tourist's head and auctioned her off as a thrall. The police have said they will be speaking to people at the museum about treatment of members of the public.

Gallery

See also
List of runestones

References

Further reading
 Sven Rosborn. Fotevikens museum: Platsen där drömmar blir till verklighet. Utgiven i samband med Fotevikens museums 10 årsjubileum 2005. [Höllviken : Fotevikens museum], 2005. . Pdf at Academia.edu; registration required.

External links
 
 Foteviken Museum

Open-air museums in Sweden
Museums established in 1993
Archaeological museums in Sweden
Living museums
Viking Age museums